Sohaila Zarrain (July 13, 1993) is a Pakistani footballer who plays as a defender for Balochistan United and the Pakistan national women's team.

Zarrain is the daughter of Pakistani women's football President and Senator Rubina Irfan and the sister of Balochistan United and National team manager Raheela Zarmeen. Another sister, Shahlyla Baloch, died in 2016.

Honours
National Women Football Championship: 2014

References

External links 
 Profile at Pakistan Football Federation (PFF)

1993 births
Pakistani women's footballers
Pakistan women's international footballers
Balochistan United W.F.C. players
Sportspeople from Quetta
Baloch people
Women's association football defenders
Living people